Giovanni Silva Tiepo (born 8 February 1998), commonly known as Tiepo, is a Brazilian footballer who plays as a goalkeeper for Chapecoense.

Career

Early career
Born in São Domingos, Santa Catarina, Tiepo joined Chapecoense's youth setup in 2012, after being released from Internacional.

Chapecoense
He made his first team debut on 9 February 2017, starting in a 2–0 away loss against Cruzeiro, for the year's Primeira Liga.

In April 2019, after spending the two previous campaigns as a third-choice, Tiepo became a starter after João Ricardo's suspension and Elias' injury. New signing Vagner arrived, but also suffered a knee injury, and Tiepo was kept as the first-choice; he made his Série A debut on 27 April, making several key stops in a 2–0 home success over Internacional.

Career statistics

Honours
Chapecoense
Campeonato Catarinense: 2017, 2020
Campeonato Brasileiro Série B: 2020

References

External links
Chapecoense profile 

1998 births
Living people
Sportspeople from Santa Catarina (state)
Brazilian footballers
Association football goalkeepers
Campeonato Brasileiro Série A players
Associação Chapecoense de Futebol players